Urziceni (or ) is a commune in Satu Mare County, Romania, right on the Hungarian border. It is composed of two villages, Urziceni and Urziceni-Pădure (Csanáloserdő).

Geography
The Urziceni Forest (Pădurea Urziceni) is a  nature reserve located on the territory of the commune.

Demographics
The population was 1,509 in 2002; 68.1% of inhabitants were Hungarian, 22.5% were German, and 9.3% were ethnic Romanian. 86.8% were Roman Catholic, 5.6% were Greek-Catholic, 4.2% were Romanian Orthodox and 3.0% were Reformed.

History
Historically, the commune was mainly inhabited by Roman Catholic German ethnics (Donauschwaben or Danube Swabians) who were brought in by the Hungarian ruler of the land, count Alexander Károlyi, to populate the area that had been deserted as a result of a series of wars and epidemics. The process began in 1711 when the first wave of settlers arrived from present-day Baden-Württemberg, just north of Lake Constance. During the 20th century they gave up the usage of the German language in favour of Hungarian. Since the 1980s, the population has dwindled significantly due to emigration to West Germany, especially before the fall of the communist regime of Nicolae Ceaușescu, but also in the 1990s, mainly for economic reasons.

Natives
 György Nonn
 József Tempfli

References

Communes in Satu Mare County
Hungarian German communities
Hungary–Romania border crossings